Anime North (AN) is a non-profit, fan-run anime convention, held every year in Etobicoke, a district in Toronto, Ontario, Canada. Its major attractions, activities and events include a Masquerade, a Dealers Room, an Artists Alley, Guest of Honor presentations, Gaming (Video and RPG), Panel Discussions, Video Presentations, Contests, and Dances.

The largest anime convention in Canada by attendance numbers and located near Toronto Pearson International Airport, AN is hosted in 6 venues: at the Toronto Congress Centre, the Doubletree International Plaza Hotel, the Sheraton Toronto Airport Hotel (formerly called the Renaissance Toronto Airport Hotel and Conference Centre), the Crowne Plaza Hotel, the Radisson Suites Hotel and the Airport Holiday Inn Hotel (for the Friday Moonlight Ball), all of which are within walking distance of one another. Convention-run shuttle buses are available during daytime and the evening to connect the venues.

Programming
Anime North in 2006 featured Kotoko, a J-pop singer, who performed songs from her newest album.  Also in 2006, a ballroom dance, the "Moonlight Masquerade Ball", was newly scheduled. The most popular events at AN include the Masquerade and the J-Idol competition. Other events include the AMV contest, guest autograph sessions, the All-Star Charity Auction, the Momiji Award (with brunch), Anime Improv, "Super Hardcore Anime Wrestling" (a co-production with GCW) and Yaoi North. Common staples at Anime North include guest speeches, gaming tournaments, dances, art-related workshops, discussion panels, martial arts displays, model contests, Go tournaments, and similar events.

History

Anime North was founded by Toronto anime fan Donald Simmons in 1997 as a one-day mini-convention with approximately 700 attendees. The original venue was the Michener Institute in downtown Toronto. In 1998 the convention expanded to two days of programming, and 1999 saw the addition of a third day of programming as well as a move to the Ramada Airport East Hotel, with attendance reaching 1,000. In 2001 AN was moved to the airport strip near Pearson Airport and was held at the Toronto Airport Marriott (attendance 2,000) and in 2002 moved to the much larger Regal Constellation Hotel (attendance 2,800).

Shortly after the 2003 convention at the Regal (attendance 5,000), the Regal closed and the convention had to find yet another new location. For 2004 the best combination of function and hotel space available was the combination of the Toronto Congress Centre (TCC) and the nearby Renaissance Hotel for additional programming. These two venues were unfortunately a 10-15 minute walk apart, although a free shuttle bus was provided to help alleviate this problem. Despite this difficulty, attendance reached a record 8,200 that year.

In 2005, Anime North added a Thursday evening badge pickup for pre-registered attendees, and changed hotels from the Renaissance to the Doubletree International Plaza Hotel, across Dixon Rd. from the TCC (attendance 9,500). In 2006 actual programming was added for Thursday evenings; approximately 12,500 people attended that year, the first time that attendance has broken 10,000 people. AN 2008 was the 12th year of the convention with 13,300 attendees, and continues to grow every year; in 2010, the convention expanded to the Marriott Toronto Airport to host the Friday Moonlight Ball. The front section of the TCC was finally opened to Anime North attendees in 2011 (it was always closed in past years), with rooms made available for Guest of Honor panels, AMV screenings, workshops and toy and model displays. In 2012, the convention expanded to 2 more hotels, the Crowne Plaza Hotel where Go and board gaming were held, and the Radisson Suites Hotel where Café Nocturne and Café Aurora Zero were located, which made in all 5 hotels in the area where Anime North operated, in addition to the Toronto Congress Centre. That year, attendance exceeded for the first time the 20,000 mark, with 22,385 paid attendees.

In 2015, the North Building of the Toronto Congress Centre was opened for Anime North to hold its Main Events room for concerts, the Masquerade and other very large shows. In 2016, the Moonlight Ball moves to a new venue, the Airport Holiday Inn Hotel.

In 2017, the North Building hosted the Conservative Party leadership election at the same time as Anime North.

In 2019, Kaeru Idols were the first idol group to host a live debut and performance at the Anime North Headquarters in Skyline A at the Delta Hotel. 

Anime North was cancelled twice due to the COVID-19 pandemic in 2020 and 2021 with virtual events held. The next event is scheduled to take place July 15–17, 2022, having been pushed back from its usual May scheduling due to Omicron variant.

Attendance cap

Anime North has considered implementing an attendance cap to address overcrowding issues. Such a cap was enacted in 2012; a decision made in fall 2011 confirmed it. Citing long lineups and overwork of staff and volunteers as the main reasons for capping attendance in 2012, they countered (compensated) this announcement by proclaiming pre-registration for the con to be opened on January 2, 2012, giving a large amount of time for fans who want to attend AN 2012 to plan ahead their convention trip.

As of early May 2012, weekend passes have sold out and none were available for purchase at the door. The convention had capped the sales of passes to the following figures:

 Full weekend: 15,000
 Friday-only: 5,000
 Saturday-only: 5,000
 Sunday-only: 5,000

Anime North 2012 had a daily cap of 20,000 attendees.

For 2013, the same attendance cap was maintained and pre-registration opened on January 2, 2013.

Event history

Note: attendance listed is based on number of paid attendees until Anime North 2016, and on warm bodies as of Anime North 2017.

Mascot
Hoppouno Momiji, a fictional redhead with a taste for both anime and anything Canadian serves as Anime North's dominant mascot. Momiji's many manifestations are used on all AN clothing, badges, and other wearables. She was originally created for the convention by the Japanese artist Hyi-San.

Notes

References

External links

 Official Anime North website

Anime conventions in Canada
Annual events in Canada
1997 establishments in Ontario
Recurring events established in 1997